Nancy Eimers (born 1954 Chicago) is an American poet.

Life
She graduated from Indiana University with an M.A., from the University of Arizona with an M.F.A., and from the University of Houston with a Ph.D.  She teaches at Western Michigan University. She is also a contributing editor at The Alaska Quarterly Review.

Her work has appeared in Paris Review, TriQuarterly, Field, The Nation, Antioch Review, North American Review, Poetry Northwest, Dunes Review.

She lives in Kalamazoo, Michigan.

Awards
 1987 Nation “Discovery” Award
 1989, 1996 Two National Endowment for the Arts Creative Writing Fellowships
 1997 Verna Emery Prize, for No Moon
 1998 Whiting Award

Works
"AFTERLIVES"; "SEPTEMBER RAIN", Bucknell

Anthologies

References

External links
Profile at The Whiting Foundation

1954 births
Living people
Vermont College of Fine Arts faculty
American women poets
American women academics
21st-century American women